The American Apparel & Footwear Association (AAFA) is a 501(c)(6) trade association. AAFA was formed in August 2000 through the merger of the American Apparel and Manufacturers Association (AAMA) and Footwear Industries of America (FIA).

As the national trade association representing apparel, footwear and other sewn products companies, and their suppliers – which compete in the global market – AAFA represents more than 1,000 world famous name brands. AAFA is the trusted public policy and political voice of the apparel and footwear industry, its management and shareholders, its three million U.S. workers, and its contribution of more than $350 billion in annual U.S. retail sales.

Today, AAFA drives progress on three key priorities: Brand Protection; Supply Chain & Sourcing; Trade, Logistics, & Manufacturing. AAFA approaches this work through the lens of purpose-driven leadership in a manner that supports each member’s ability to build and sustain inclusive and diverse cultures, meet and advance ESG goals, and draw upon the latest technology.

AAFA is led by President and CEO Steve Lamar and the AAFA Board of Directors. The AAFA Board of Directors includes five officers:

 Chair: Sarah Clarke, Chief Supply Chain Officer, PVH Corp.
 Vice Chair: Ted Dagnese, Chief Supply Chain Officer, Lululemon Athletica
 Treasurer: Katherine Gold, President, Goldbug Inc.
 Secretary: Josue Solano, CEO, BBC International
 Past Chair: Colin Browne, Interim President and CEO, Under Armour, Inc.

References

External links
 

Trade associations based in the United States
2000 establishments in the United States

501(c)(6) nonprofit organizations